The Internal Security Act, 1982 (Act No. 74 of 1982) was an act of the Parliament of South Africa that consolidated and replaced various earlier pieces of security legislation, including the Suppression of Communism Act, 1950, parts of the Riotous Assemblies Act, 1956, the Unlawful Organizations Act, 1960 and the Terrorism Act, 1967. It gave the apartheid government broad powers to ban or restrict organisations, publications, people and public gatherings, and to detain people without trial. The Act was passed as a consequence of the recommendations of the Rabie Commission, which had enquired into the state of security legislation.

It took over from the Suppression of Communism Act as the basis for serving banning orders on people. It also provided for house arrest.

Most of the Act was progressively repealed during the transitional period between 1990 (when in October, the last of five successive years of states of emergency concluded) and 1996, with the last remaining sections repealed in 2005.

References

External links
 

Apartheid laws in South Africa
Terrorism in South Africa
Terrorism laws
1982 in South African law